The X Factor is a British television music competition to find new singing talent. The sixth series started on ITV on 22 August 2009 and was won by Joe McElderry on 13 December 2009. Cheryl Cole emerged as the winning mentor for the second consecutive year, the first time in the show's history that a mentor has won back-to-back series. The show was presented by Dermot O'Leary, with spin-off show The Xtra Factor presented by Holly Willoughby on ITV2. McElderry's winner's single was a cover version of Miley Cyrus's "The Climb". Public auditions by aspiring singers began in June 2009 and were held in five cities across the UK. Simon Cowell, Louis Walsh, Dannii Minogue and Cole returned as judges. This season was the first to be sponsored by TalkTalk after they took over the sponsorship from The Carphone Warehouse. For the first time, auditions were held in front of a live audience. Following initial auditions, the "bootcamp" stage took place in August 2009, where the number of contestants was narrowed down to 24. The 24 contestants were split into their categories, Boys, Girls, Over 25s and Groups, and given a judge to mentor them at the "judges' houses" stage and throughout the finals.

During "judges' houses", the 24 acts were reduced to twelve, with one act being eliminated each week by a combination of public vote and judges' decision until a winner was found. The live shows started on 10 October 2009. The acts performed every Saturday night with the results announced on Sundays. This was change of format from previous series in which the results were announced later on the Saturday evening. This series was sponsored by TalkTalk.

Judges, presenters and other personnel

During series 5, it was rumoured that Dannii Minogue would not return as a judge for series 6. Spice Girls singer Victoria Beckham was reported as a replacement for Minogue. In June 2009, however, it was confirmed that Minogue, Simon Cowell, Cheryl Cole and Louis Walsh would all return as judges for series 6. Walsh missed the first results show due to Boyzone member Stephen Gateley's sudden death and missed the second week due to attending Gateley's funeral.

Dermot O'Leary returned to present the main show on ITV, while Holly Willoughby returned as presenter on The Xtra Factor on ITV2. Brian Friedman returned to the show as creative director and Yvie Burnett returned as vocal coach.

Selection process

Auditions

Auditions were held during June and July 2009 across five cities: London, Birmingham, Manchester, Cardiff and Glasgow. In a change to previous series, auditions were held in front of a live audience due to the success of a similar system on Britain's Got Talent. However, Glaswegian auditionees had already been judged using the old format, meaning that they had to apply again, as their initial audition was void.

Bootcamp
As with the auditions, the "Bootcamp" selection stage was filmed in front of a live audience. Filming took place on 1 August at the HMV Hammersmith Apollo. Approximately 200 acts attended bootcamp. They were initially split into groups of three, and judges gave instant decisions on who would leave based on the group performances, bringing the number of acts down to 100. The judges then cut the number of acts down to 50. Following a further set of auditions, the number of contestants was narrowed to 24. Originally, the group Trucolorz were chosen by the judges for the final 24 but were disqualified due to one of the group's members being too young for the show, and they were replaced by Harmony Hood.

The contestants were then split into the usual four categories before the judges discovered which category they would mentor for the rest of the competition. The Boys (16–24) were mentored by Cole, Minogue had the Girls (16–24), Cowell mentored the Over 25s, and Walsh took charge of the Groups.

Judges' houses
Each judge had help from a guest judge during the "Judges' houses" stage. Will Young assisted Cole in Marrakech, Morocco, Minogue had help from her sister Kylie Minogue in Atlantis, The Palm, Dubai, Boyzone singer Ronan Keating helped Walsh near Lake Como in Italy, and Cowell had help from Sinitta in Los Angeles. At Judges' Houses, each act sang for their respective judge, and each judge and their guest eliminated three acts, leaving 12 acts to perform in the live shows.

Judges Houses Performances
 Acts in bold advanced

Boys:
 Joe: "Sorry Seems to Be the Hardest Word"
 Lloyd: "I'm Yours"
 Daniel F:  "Without You"
 Ethan: "I Guess That's Why They Call It the Blues" 
 Duane: "Closer"
 Rikki: "You've Got a Friend"

Groups:
 Project A: "What's Up?"
 Kandy Rain: "Paparazzi"
 De-Tour: "Tiny Dancer"
 Harmony Hood: "Never Can Say Goodbye"
 Miss Frank: "Respect"
 John & Edward: "I Want It That Way"

Over 25s:
 Olly: "A Song for You"
 Treyc: "All the Man That I Need"
 Daniel P: "Praying for Time"
 Nicole L: "Up to the Mountain" 
 Danyl: "Fallin'"
 Jamie: "Stop Crying Your Heart Out"

Girls:
 Stacey S:"Over the Rainbow"
 Stacey M:"Sometimes"
 Rachel:"Nobody Knows"
 Despina:"The Voice Within" 
 Lucie:"Anything for You"
 Nicole J:  "Lately"
{| class="wikitable plainrowheaders"
|+Summary of judges' houses
|-
! Judge
! Category
! Location
! Assistant
! Acts Eliminated
|-
!scope="row"| Cole
| Boys
| Marrakech
| Will Young
| Ethan Boroian, Daniel Fox, Duane Lamonte
|-
!scope="row"| Cowell
| Over 25s
| Los Angeles
| Sinitta
| Treyc Cohen, Nicole Lawrence, Daniel Pearce
|-
!scope="row"| Minogue
| Girls
| Atlantis, The Palm, Dubai
| Kylie Minogue
| Nicole Jackson, Stacey McClean, Despina Pilavakis 
|-
!scope="row"| Walsh
| Groups
| Lake Como, Italy
| Ronan Keating
| De-Tour, Harmony Hood, Project A
|}

Acts 

Key:
 – Winner
 – Runner-Up

Live shows
The live shows began on 10 October 2009, and continued through to the finale on 12 December 2009. For this series the results shows were on Sunday nights instead of Saturdays as they were for the first five series. In another change to the format of previous years, the remaining finalists performed a song as a group at the start of each results show. As previously, each week had a different song theme. Each act performed one song on the Saturday night show and the results were announced on the Sunday. Beginning with week 8 of the live shows, with five acts remaining, each contestant would sing two songs. Up to week 8, the two acts with the fewest public votes were in the bottom two and would sing again in the "final showdown". The songs they performed in the bottom two were of their own choice and did not necessarily follow that week's theme. The four judges then each chose one act from the bottom two that they wanted to be eliminated from the show. If each act received an equal number of judges' votes, the vote went to deadlock and the act with the fewest public votes was eliminated. From week 8 onwards, there was no bottom two and the act with the fewest votes was eliminated. In a change to the format of previous years, the remaining finalists performed a song as a group at the start of each results show.

Musical guests
During each results show, either one or two guest artists would perform. Series 5 winner Alexandra Burke and Robbie Williams performed on the first live results show, with Whitney Houston and judge Cole on the second. Michael Bublé and Westlife appeared on the third week, and Bon Jovi and JLS performed in week 4. Leona Lewis and The Black Eyed Peas performed for week 5, while week 6 featured a performance from Shakira. Susan Boyle appeared on the show for week 7 along with Mariah Carey. Rihanna and Alicia Keys performed in week 8 with Janet Jackson and Lady Gaga appearing in week 9. Guests in the final were Robbie Williams, Michael Bublé and George Michael (Saturday show) and Burke, JLS, Lewis, George Michael and Paul McCartney (Sunday show). In some weeks, the guest performers also mentored the acts in the run-up to that week's live show.

The choice of musical guests on The X Factor live shows had a significant impact on the UK Singles Chart. Of the seven singles that made number one from 18 October to 19 December, six of them had done so after having been performed on an X Factor live show the previous weekend. They were, in order: "Bad Boys" by Alexandra Burke, "Fight for This Love" by Cole, "Everybody in Love" by JLS, "Meet Me Halfway" by the Black Eyed Peas, "You Are Not Alone" by the finalists and "Bad Romance" by Lady Gaga. This impact was noted by several commentators. After "Bad Romance" became the sixth song to reach Number One off the back of a performance on The X Factor, James Masterton of Yahoo! Music called the show "a guarantor of Number One hits". Gennaro Castaldo of HMV remarked: "In an age when there are very few truly mass-audience platforms left, the X Factor has become pivotal for those labels and artists seeking to reach a family-based audience." Paul Williams, editor of Music Week, explained: "The impact of the programme's incredible numbers on music sales is all too evident, with the top end of the singles and albums charts week after week since the current season began heavily dominated by whoever has been on the show."

Results summary
Colour key
 Act in team Dannii

 Act in team Simon

 Act in team Cheryl

 Act in team Louis 

 On behalf of Walsh's absence, an automatic vote was cast against Rachel Adedeji, based on the usual assumption that he would vote to save his act who he mentored, Kandy Rain if he were present which typically occurs when a judge has their own act who they mentor in the final showdown.
 Walsh did not vote due to his absence, but confirmed on the following The Xtra Factor via phone call that he would have voted to eliminate Rikki Loney.

Live show details

Week 1 (10/11 October)
Theme: Musical heroes
Guest mentor: Robbie Williams
Group performance: "I Gotta Feeling"
Musical guests: Alexandra Burke featuring Flo Rida ("Bad Boys") and Robbie Williams ("Bodies")
 Best bits song: "Emotion"

Walsh was absent from the Sunday night results show due to the sudden death of Boyzone singer and close friend Stephen Gately, whom he managed. Due to this, the show did not take its usual format; there were no lights and neither O'Leary nor the three other judges made an entrance. Instead, the show commenced with O'Leary already on stage and the judges already sitting at their desk. Both O'Leary and Cowell addressed the viewers and audience regarding Gately's death and Walsh's absence. Following this, the show went on as normal with Minogue, Cowell and Cole present as judges.

Judges' votes to eliminate
Walsh: Rachel Adedeji – despite his absence, an automatic vote was cast to save Kandy Rain based on the usual assumption that he would have voted to save his own act.
Minogue: Kandy Rain – backed her own act, Rachel Adedeji.
Cole: Kandy Rain – gave no reason.
Cowell: Rachel Adedeji – said that Kandy Rain had not been given a "fair crack" in the competition and was interested in seeing them for a second week.

With the acts in the bottom two receiving two votes each, the result went to deadlock and reverted to the earlier public vote. Kandy Rain were eliminated as the act with the fewest public votes.

Week 2 (17/18 October)
Theme: Divas
Guest mentors: Whitney Houston and Clive Davis
Group performance: "Queen of the Night"
Musical guests: Cheryl Cole ("Fight for This Love") and Whitney Houston ("Million Dollar Bill")
 Best bits song: "Chasing Cars"

Walsh was absent from both shows this weekend, again due to Stephen Gately's death. The funeral took place on 17 October and Walsh paid his respects. This statement was released: "Due to recent tragic events, Louis Walsh will not be appearing on either the Saturday or Sunday live The X Factor shows this weekend as he is attending Stephen Gately's funeral. Louis has been in close contact with his acts throughout the week, although his opinions will not be represented in the show this weekend."

For the first time in the show's history, a contestant sang a cover version of a new song that had not yet even been sung live by the original recording artist. Cowell's decision for Danyl Johnson to sing "I Didn't Know My Own Strength" garnered a disapproving reception from Houston, with Cowell saying that Johnson "didn't exactly get rave reviews [from Houston and Davis] in that room [for the masterclass]."

Judges' votes to eliminate
Minogue: Rikki Loney – gave no reason but effectively backed her own act, Rachel Adedeji.
Cole: Rachel Adedeji – backed her own act, Rikki Loney.
Cowell: Rikki Loney – based his choice on their last performances.
Walsh was not present for the results show, but according to a phone call on The Xtra Factor, he would have voted to eliminate Loney.

Week 3 (24/25 October)
Theme: Big band
Guest mentor: Michael Bublé
Group performance: "Fascination"
Musical guests: Westlife ("What About Now") and Michael Bublé ("Cry Me a River")
 Best bits song: "Chasing Pavements"

Judges' votes to eliminate
Walsh: Danyl Johnson – backed his own act, Miss Frank.
Cowell: Miss Frank – backed his own act, Danyl Johnson.
Minogue: Miss Frank – based on the final showdown performance.
Cole: Danyl Johnson – felt confused by the public vote so chose to take it to deadlock.

With the acts in the bottom two receiving two votes each, the result went to deadlock and reverted to the earlier public vote. Miss Frank were eliminated as the act with the fewest public votes.

Week 4 (31 October/1 November)
Theme: Rock
Group performance: "Walk This Way"
Musical guests: Bon Jovi ("We Weren't Born to Follow") and JLS ("Everybody in Love")
 Best bits song: "Take a Bow"

Judges' votes to eliminate
Minogue: Lloyd Daniels – backed her own act, Rachel Adedeji.
Walsh: Lloyd Daniels – said Adedeji was better than Daniels.
Cole: Rachel Adedeji – backed her own act, Lloyd Daniels.
Cowell: Rachel Adedeji – could not decide so chose to take the vote to deadlock; said Adedeji was better than Daniels, but took Daniels' sore throat into account and thought the public were not accepting Adedeji after her third time in the showdown in four weeks.

With the acts in the bottom two receiving two votes each, the result went to deadlock and reverted to the earlier public vote. Adedeji was eliminated as the act with the fewest public votes.

Week 5 (7/8 November)
Theme: Songs from films
Group performance: "Hot n Cold"
Musical guests: The Black Eyed Peas ("Meet Me Halfway") and Leona Lewis ("Happy")
 Best bits song: "I'm Not a Girl, Not Yet a Woman"

Judges' votes to eliminate
Walsh: Lucie Jones – backed his own act, John & Edward.
Minogue: John & Edward – gave no reason but effectively backed her own act, Lucie Jones.
Cole: John & Edward – gave no reason.
Cowell: Lucie Jones – stated that although neither act could win, he was more interested in seeing John and Edward again and that there was "a ceiling" for Jones.

With the acts in the bottom two receiving two votes each, the result went to deadlock and reverted to the earlier public vote. Jones was eliminated as the act with the fewest public votes.

Week 6 (14/15 November)
Theme: Songs by Queen
Guest mentors: Brian May and Roger Taylor
Group performances: "Bohemian Rhapsody" (performed with Brian May and Roger Taylor) and "You Are Not Alone" (all finalists)
Musical guest: Shakira ("Did It Again")
 Best bits song: "One"

Judges' votes to eliminate
Cowell: Lloyd Daniels – gave no reason but effectively backed his own act, Jamie Archer.
Cole: Jamie Archer – backed her own act, Lloyd Daniels.
Walsh: Jamie Archer – believed Daniels would go further in the competition.
Minogue: Lloyd Daniels – thought Archer sang better in the final showdown.

With the acts in the bottom two receiving two votes each, the result went to deadlock and reverted to the earlier public vote. Archer was eliminated as the act with the fewest public votes.

Week 7 (21/22 November)
Theme: Songs by Wham! or George Michael
Group performance: "Wake Me Up Before You Go-Go"
Musical guests: Susan Boyle ("Wild Horses") and Mariah Carey ("I Want to Know What Love Is")
 Best bits song: "Let's Get Ready to Rhumble"

Judges' votes to eliminate
Cowell: John & Edward – backed his own act, Olly Murs.
Cole: John & Edward – gave no reason.
Walsh: Olly Murs – gave no reason but effectively backed his own act, John & Edward.
Minogue: John & Edward – based on the premise that the show is a "singing competition".

However, voting statistics revealed that John & Edward received more votes than Murs which meant that if Minogue sent the result to deadlock, John & Edward would have advanced to the quarter-final and Murs would have been eliminated.

Week 8: Quarter-Final (28/29 November)
Themes: Songs by Take That; songs by Elton John
Group performance: "I Don't Feel Like Dancin'"
Musical guests: Alicia Keys ("Empire State of Mind" / "Doesn't Mean Anything" / "No One") and Rihanna ("Russian Roulette")
 Best bits song: "You Give Me Something"

The quarter-final did not feature a final showdown and instead the act with the fewest public votes, Lloyd Daniels, was automatically eliminated. After his elimination, Daniels reprised his quarter-final performance of "A Million Love Songs" as his exit song.

Week 9: Semi-Final (5/6 December)
Themes: Songs by Michael Jackson; mentor's choice
Group performance: "Wanna Be Startin' Somethin'" / "Don't Stop the Music"
Musical guests: Lady Gaga ("Bad Romance") and Janet Jackson ("All for You" / "Make Me")
 Best bits song: "What About Now"

The semi-final did not feature a final showdown and instead the act with the fewest public votes, Danyl Johnson, was automatically eliminated. After his elimination, Johnson reprised his semi-final performance of "Man in the Mirror" as his exit song.

Week 10: Final (12/13 December)
12 December
Themes: Audition songs; celebrity duets; mentor's favourite performance ("song of the series")
Musical guest: Robbie Williams ("You Know Me")
Best bits song: "What a Wonderful World"

The show also featured Jeff Brazier reporting from Solomon's home town of Dagenham, Michael Underwood in Colchester for Murs and Kimberley Walsh in McElderry's home town of South Shields.

13 December
Themes: Favourite performance ("song of the series"); winner's single
Group performance: "Never Forget" (all finalists)
Musical guests: Alexandra Burke and JLS ("Bad Boys" / "Everybody in Love"), Leona Lewis ("Stop Crying Your Heart Out"), George Michael ("December Song"), Paul McCartney ("Drive My Car" and "Live and Let Die" )
Best bits songs: "Red" (Olly Murs) & "The World's Greatest" (Joe McElderry)

Sponsors
This series of The X Factor was sponsored by TalkTalk and featured break bumpers pioneered by CHI & Partners, showing light graffiti set against night-time backdrops across the United Kingdom. Part of the deal, which applied to ITV, ITV2 and the programme's website, saw TalkTalk customers having the chance to design the break bumpers and download exclusive content. In the Republic of Ireland, the series was sponsored by Domino's Pizza.

Reception

Ratings
The first episode, which was broadcast on 22 August and showed the first set of auditions, attracted 9.9 million viewers; 47.9% of the viewing audience and the largest number of viewers within its timeslot. One week later, 9.75 million people viewed the second episode; a 47.1% share of the TV audience. The third episode averaged 11.76 million viewers and a 51.9% audience share. Episode four attracted 10.26 million viewers. The fifth episode, which was scheduled directly against Strictly Come Dancing drew in about 9.27 million viewers, compared to 7.72 for Strictly. The X Factor reached a record high number of viewers for the second and third results shows on 18 and 25 October, scoring 14.8 million viewers each. This was beaten on 8 November when the fifth results show peaked at 16.6 million people.

The final episode peaked with 19.1 million viewers when Joe McElderry was announced as the winner.

Controversies

Bootcamp

On 2 August 2009, The People reported that some bootcamp contestants felt they had been poorly treated by the show's producers; one compared the experience with that of a concentration camp and another claimed that those competing were only allowed to use the toilet twice a day. However, a spokesperson for the programme denied the claims, saying "Yes, it was long hours but they knew what they were signing up for. The hopefuls got breakfast at the hotel and decent food throughout the day".

Audition format

This season's audition format, in which the auditions were held in front of a studio audience, was criticised by fans, by Cole and by certain former contestants. These included Alexandra Burke, who branded it "too intimidating", and the members of JLS who stated it detracted from the intimacy of the auditions.

Recycled contestants

The show was criticised in September 2009 for "recycling" contestants, as three singers from the final 24 acts had already been in pop bands, two had auditioned for The X Factor in previous years and one had appeared on Britain's Got Talent.

Danyl Johnson

Controversy began after the first live show on 10 October, after Minogue commented on press reports regarding Danyl Johnson's sexuality, sparking an online backlash. Minogue released a statement on her comments:

"I want to clear up exactly what happened on last night's X Factor show and post my sincere apologies to anyone who took offense . I made a comment about Danyl changing the lyrics of his song. It was meant to be a humorous moment about the fact he has an opportunity to have fun with his song. An openly bi-sexual singing a song that is lyrically a 'girl's song'. Danyl and I were joking about the very same thing in rehearsals on Friday, so it carried on to the show. I'd like to apologise to anyone that was offended by my comments, it was never my intention. I spoke to Danyl straight after the show last night and he wasn't offended or upset by my comments, and knew exactly what I was saying."

Minogue also apologised on the live results show on 11 October, saying Danyl was not upset by her comments. It has since been reported that Ofcom received around 4000 complaints from viewers over the comment.

References

External links
 

 06
2009 in British television
2009 in British music
2009 British television seasons
United Kingdom 06